Redbridge may refer to:

Places
London Borough of Redbridge, England
Redbridge, London, a place in that borough
Redbridge tube station
Redbridge, Kansas City, a neighborhood in South Kansas City, Missouri, USA
Redbridge, Hampshire, England
Redbridge, Ontario, Canada
Redbridge, Oxford, England

Other
An Anheuser-Busch brand
Redbridge F.C.

See also
 Red Bridge (disambiguation)